Mumtaz Ahmed Tarar is a Pakistani politician who served as Minister for Human Rights, in Abbasi cabinet from August 2017 to May 2018. He had been a member of the National Assembly of Pakistan, between 1988 and May 2018.

Political career
He was elected to the National Assembly of Pakistan as a candidate of Pakistan Muslim League (N) (PML-N) from Constituency NA-83 (Gujrat-IV) in 1988 Pakistani general election. He received 50,520 votes and defeated a candidate of Pakistan Peoples Party (PPP).

He was re-elected to the National Assembly as a candidate of PML-N from Constituency NA-83 (Mandi Bahauddin-cum-Gujrat) in 1997 Pakistani general election. He received 64,233 votes and defeated a candidate of PPP.

He decided to not contest 2002 general election and withdrew his nomination papers in favour of a candidate of Muttahida Majlis-e-Amal.

He did not contested 2008 general election and withdrew his nomination papers in favour of an independent candidate Muhammad Ijaz Ahmed Chaudhary.

He ran for the seat of the National Assembly as a candidate of PML-N from Constituency NA-108 (Mandi Bahauddin-I) in 2013 Pakistani general election but was unsuccessful. He received 73,789 votes and lost the seat to Muhammad Ijaz Ahmed Chaudhary.

He was re-elected to the National Assembly as a candidate of PML-N from Constituency NA-108 (Mandi Bahauddin-I) in by-elections held in June 2015, after the seat fell vacant following the disqualification of Muhammad Ijaz Ahmed Chaudhary due to fake degree case. He received 77,884 votes and defeated Tariq Tarar, a candidate of Pakistan Tehreek-e-Insaf.

Following the election of Shahid Khaqan Abbasi as Prime Minister of Pakistan in August 2017, Tarar was offered the cabinet portfolio of Ministry of Science and Technology, however he declined it. Later, he was inducted into the cabinet of Abbasi as Minister for Human Rights with the status of a federal minister. Upon the dissolution of the National Assembly on the expiration of its term on 31 May 2018, Tarar ceased to hold the office as Federal Minister for Human Rights.

References

Living people
Pakistan Muslim League (N) politicians
Punjabi people
Pakistani MNAs 2013–2018
Year of birth missing (living people)
Pakistani MNAs 1988–1990
Pakistani MNAs 1997–1999
Government ministers of Pakistan